Pablo Agüero (born 13 May 1977 in Mendoza, Argentina) is an Argentine-French filmmaker. Raised in the Argentinean Patagonia, Pablo Agüero obtained international recognition with "Primera Nieve", winner of the Grand Jury Prize in the Official Competition of the Cannes Festival 2006.

Some of the actors who participated in his films are John Cale (Velvet Underground), who acted for the first time in the cinema in "Salamandra". Gael García Bernal (Amores perros, La mala Educación), Denis Lavant (Mister Lonely, Holy Motors) and Imanol Arias (La Flor de mi Secreto) were gathered for the first time in "Eva no duerme". Jeanne Moreau performed a radio adaptation of "Eva no Duerme" and an original song together with Gotan Project. It was the last performance of her life. Géraldine Chaplin plays "God" in "Madres de los Dioses".

Filmography
 Lejos del Sol (short, 2005)
 Primera Nieve (short, 2006)
 Salamandra (2008)
 77 Doronship (2009)
 Madres de los Dioses (2015)
 Eva Doesn't Sleep (2015)
 A Son of Man (2018)
 Coven (2020)

Awards and nominations

Wins 
2005 Best Short Film Award for Lejos del Sol at the Buenos Aires International Festival of Independent Cinema
 2005 Best Short Film Award for Lejos del Sol at the Cork International Film Festival
 2006 Jury Prize (Cannes Film Festival) for Primera Nieve
 2006 First Prize at the Gijón International Film Festival for Primera Nieve
 2006 Best Opera Prima for Primera Nieve by the National Institute of Cinema and Audiovisual Arts
 2009 Best Director for 77 Doronship at the Buenos Aires International Festival of Independent Cinema
 2012 Grand Prix for the Best Scriptwriter at SOPADIN, France, for Eva No Duerme.
 2015 Ecumenical Award at Visions du Réel for Madre de los Dioses.
 2015 Best Director for Eva Doesn't Sleep at Amiens International Film Festival
 2015 Best Argentinian Movie of the Year at Pantalla Pinamar for Eva Doesn't Sleep
 2015 Silvestre First Prize at the IndieLisboa International Independent Film Festival for Eva Doesn't Sleep
2015 Ciné-plus Award at the Toulouse Latin American Film Festival for Eva Doesn't Sleep
 2016 Silver Condor Award for Best Director for Eva Doesn't Sleep
 2016 Best Cinematography at the Argentine Film Critics Association for Eva Doesn't Sleep
 2016 Best Art Direction at the Argentine Film Critics Association for Eva Doesn't Sleep
 2016 Best Costume Design at the Argentine Film Critics Association for Eva Doesn't Sleep
2016 Best Sound at the Argentine Film Critics Association for Eva Doesn't Sleep
2019 Best Feature at the Rhode Island International Film Festival for A Son of Man
2019 ARTE Award at the San Sebastián International Film Festival for Akelarre

Nominations 

 2006 Short Film Palme d'Or (Cannes Film Festival) for Primera Nieve
 2006 Cinéfondation Residence for Salamandra
 2006 Cinéfondation Atelier for Salamandra
 2006 Caméra d'Or for Salamandra
 2006 Directors' Fortnight for Salamandra
 2015 Golden Shell for Eva Doesn't Sleep
 2016 11 Argentine Film Critics Association Nominations for Eva Doesn't Sleep
 2019 Ecuador's selection for the Academy Awards: A Son of Man
 2020 Directors' Fortnight for Akelarre
 2020 Golden Shell for Akelarre
 2021 6 Premios Feroz Nominations for Akelarre
 2021 Best Film at the Forqué Awards for Akelarre

References

External links

Argentine film directors
Argentine screenwriters
1977 births
People from Mendoza, Argentina
Living people